Robert Marek Korzeniowski (born 30 July 1968) is a Polish former racewalker who won four gold medals at the Olympic Games and three gold medals at World Championships.

Biography
Korzeniowski was born in Lubaczów, and is the brother of fellow Olympic athlete Sylwia Korzeniowska.

Career

Korzeniowski won three consecutive Olympic gold medals in the 50 km walk at Atlanta 1996, Sydney 2000, and Athens 2004.

In addition, he became the first athlete to win the gold medal in both the 50 km walk and 20 km walk at a single Olympic Games in Sydney.

He won World Championship titles in the 50 km walk at the 1997 World Championships, 2001 World Championships, and 2003 World Championships.

He also won European Championship twice in the 50 km walk in 1998 in Budapest and 2002 in Munich.

He is also the former world record holder in the 50 km walk from 2002 to 2006.

Post-career

Korzeniowski retired after the 2004 Olympic Games and became actively involved in various roles at the International Olympic Committee.

He was the coach and mentor of former world record-holder Paquillo Fernández.

Since 2005 he worked for the public Polish Television (TVP) as a chief of sport department and in 2007 he became a General Manager of TVP Sport, a new specialized channel in Poland. On 6 November 2009, he announced his resignation.

In 2014 Korzeniowski was inducted into the International Association of Athletics Federations' Hall of Fame.

State awards

For his sport achievements, Korzeniowski received the Order of Polonia Restituta:

 1996  Knight's Cross (5th Class) 
 2000  Officer's Cross (4th Class) 
 2004  Commander's Cross (3rd Class)

Competition record

See also
 Polish records in athletics
 2002 Race Walking Year Ranking

References

External links

Official website 
IOC tribute

1968 births
Living people
People from Lubaczów
Polish male racewalkers
Athletes (track and field) at the 1992 Summer Olympics
Athletes (track and field) at the 1996 Summer Olympics
Athletes (track and field) at the 2000 Summer Olympics
Athletes (track and field) at the 2004 Summer Olympics
Olympic athletes of Poland
Olympic gold medalists for Poland
World record setters in athletics (track and field)
World Athletics Championships medalists
European Athletics Championships medalists
Medalists at the 2004 Summer Olympics
Sportspeople from Podkarpackie Voivodeship
Medalists at the 2000 Summer Olympics
Medalists at the 1996 Summer Olympics
Olympic gold medalists in athletics (track and field)
Universiade medalists in athletics (track and field)
Goodwill Games medalists in athletics
Universiade gold medalists for Poland
World Athletics Championships winners
Competitors at the 1989 Summer Universiade
Medalists at the 1991 Summer Universiade
Medalists at the 1993 Summer Universiade
Competitors at the 2001 Goodwill Games